Cedric McMillan (August 17, 1977 – April 12, 2022) was an American IFBB professional bodybuilder and United States Army Instructor. 
His last victory was the 2017 Arnold Classic. McMillan was one of the leading bodybuilders of the 21st century, with a classic physique that recalls the 'golden age' of bodybuilding over the larger physiques of the present era.

Statistics

Offseason weight: 295 – 310 lbs (133.8 kg – 140.6 kg)
Precontest weight: 280 lbs
Height: 6’1” (185.42 cm)
Age:	44 years
Nationality:	American

Early life and amateur career
As a child, McMillan took a real interest in muscular physiques and drew comic characters that had impressive physiques. His idol was 7x Mr. Olympia Arnold Schwarzenegger, who inspired him, especially after seeing Schwarzenegger in Conan The Barbarian. McMillan started training at thirteen after his mother bought him a weight set. It wasn’t long before he learned that he had good genetics for bodybuilding and a passion for the sport.

After high school, McMillan joined the US Army, moving to South Carolina. Not long after, his friend Mark Neil convinced him to enter his first bodybuilding competition. Neil helped McMillan gain a lot of size and learn more about bodybuilding. After Neil saw how McMillan's physique developed after just one month of training, he encouraged McMillan to compete in a bodybuilding show that was only four weeks away. During those four weeks before the competition, he grew from an initial weight of 195 lbs to 225 lbs, competing at 205 lbs. He entered the NPC South Carolina in 2007 and won the super heavyweight division.

Professional career
McMillan was a top open division bodybuilder with 8 Pro wins while placing top 5 in major competitions on several occasions. He earned his Pro card in 2009 and, since, had been in the conversation with the best open bodybuilders in the world.

His most notable victory was the 2017 Arnold Classic Ohio where he got to meet his idol, Arnold Schwarzenegger, earning praise from the former Mr. Olympia. His most recent competition was the 2020 Arnold Classic Ohio where he placed 6th.

Profile
McMillan was renowned for his aesthetic physique which stood out from the larger and blockier mass physiques that dominate the sport. At over 6'1', McMillan stood taller than most competitors and he chose to present a more aesthetic look which he often presented through highly choreographed posing to classical music that reminded many of the great bodybuilders from the 1980s – a real contrast to mass monsters like Ronnie Coleman or Jay Cutler.

With his combination of impressive size, height and aesthetic classic lines, McMillan achieved great success, particularly at the Arnold Classic. Indeed, the contrast between his pleasing physique and the larger mass monster look of other competitors such as Phil Heath led to calls by Arnold Schwarzenegger to rein in the waistlines of bodybuilders on the IFBB stage.

However, despite setting the bar for a newer, more appealing look in the sport, McMillan was generally considered to have underperformed at the Mr Olympia finals, which often rewards the largest, most muscular physiques, placing the taller McMillan at a disadvantage. This is also a challenge that has been faced by bodybuilders of a similar physique and stature, such as Evan Centopani and Patrick Moore. Many critics considered him an uncrowned Mr Olympia and fan favorite.

Personal life
McMillan resided in Columbia, South Carolina, where he was a sergeant first class and an instructor at Fort Jackson, SC. He described himself as a family man and was still close friends with his childhood friends. An amateur artist talented in drawing with an interest in music and culture, McMillan often showcased his artistic talents in highly elaborate and highly choreographed posing routines.

McMillan died of a heart attack on April 12, 2022, at the age of 44.

Competition history

See also
Brandon Curry
Mamdouh Elssbiay
Roelly Winklaar

References

External links 
 Facebook page
 Cedric McMillan dies at 44

1977 births
2022 deaths
People from Maplewood, New Jersey
American bodybuilders
African-American bodybuilders
Military personnel from New Jersey
Sportspeople from New Jersey
Professional bodybuilders
21st-century African-American sportspeople
20th-century African-American sportspeople
Deaths from coronary artery disease